Instinkt Obrechyonnykh (lit. Instinct of the Doomed) is the fifth studio album by the Russian metalcore band Amatory. The album was produced by Tue Madsen.

Track listing

Personnel

Amatory
Alexander [ALEX] Pavlov — guitars, keyboards, samples
Denis [DENVER] Zhivotovskiy — bass, clean & growled vocals
Dmitriy [JAY] Rubanosky — guitars
Daniil [STEWART] Svetlov — drums, samples on track 4
Vyacheslav [SLAVA] Sokolov — screamed & clean vocals

Guest appearances
Alexander Zarankin – keyboards (12)
Heiko Klotz – keyboards (4)
Evgeniy "PJ" Potekhin - additional vocals (2,3)

References

2010 albums
Amatory albums
Albums produced by Tue Madsen